Shirish Rummun (born 8 July 1971) is a Mauritian weightlifter. He competed in the men's heavyweight II event at the 1996 Summer Olympics.

References

External links
 

1971 births
Living people
Mauritian male weightlifters
Olympic weightlifters of Mauritius
Weightlifters at the 1996 Summer Olympics
Mauritian people of Indian descent